Chersonesia peraka is an Indomalayan butterfly of the family Nymphalidae (Cyrestinae). It is found in the Indomalayan realm from Burma to Malaysia and on to Java, Bali, Borneo, Sumatra and Nias.

References

Cyrestinae
Butterflies described in 1883